The All Japan Students Photo Association was a large scale organization that functioned to consolidate student-based photography clubs across Japan.

Establishment 
The origins of The All Japan Students Photo Association can be traced years before the establishment of the actual organization itself. As commercial cameras became more accessible, Japan experienced a proliferation of photography clubs, a movement that eventually made its way to college campuses in the 1930s. According to photography historian Ryuichi Kaneko, in the years leading up to the establishment of the All Japan Students Photo Association there were various student-based photography clubs at Kwansei Gakuin University, Konan High School, Meiji University, Aichi University, and others.

These student-based photography clubs became the foundation of the All Japan Students Photo Association which was established in 1952. Its purpose was to unite and formalize the loose associations between the various student-based photography clubs. The organization was based in the office of Fuji Film, they endeavored to create platforms for the students to showcase their works with photography competitions and offered courses to teach students photographic techniques by inviting photographers like Domon Ken and Kimura Ihee. By 1953, the organization had grown with affiliated photography clubs at 234 universities, 931 high schools, and a total of 34,347 student photographers.

“Collective Production” 
In the late 1950s, the photography clubs engaged in “collective production”. Club members would decide upon themes, usually social issues, and designate members to shoot different sites according to those themes. The approach was quite a contrast with the conventional individualism of amateur photographers of the time. Kaneko explains that this method reflected a “shared consciousness of issues and the relative ease of shooting with everyone participating” contributing to a conviviality and a continuous exchange of ideas between members. There was also the aspect of anonymity in “collective production” where the hierarchies of the students in the club were not evident in the resulting photographs which were then selected carefully and published in photobooks such as Hiroshima, HIROSHIMA, hirou-shima, which reveals the persistent trauma of city even years after the fall of the atomic bomb; Kono Chijo ni Wareware no Kuni ha Nai (“On This Land We Have No Country”) reveal various environmental repercussions of economic development which include photos of people with Minamata disease; and many photobooks. This methodology eventually lost traction as “collective production” merely devolved into a means to preserve the existence of the club and many projects did not result in photo books until they were finished much later by alumni of the organization.

References

Student societies in Japan
Japanese photography organizations
Arts organizations established in 1952
1952 establishments in Japan